Freshwater Beach is a beach located in Freshwater, New South Wales, a suburb of Sydney, Australia. Freshwater Beach is the first beach north of Manly, New South Wales, on the Peninsula. The beach is flanked by a headland at each end and can produce excellent surf. There is a large rock pool at the northern end. The beach is patrolled by lifeguards and has its own surf lifesaving club. Freshwater Beach is one of the most popular of Sydney’s 21 Northern Beaches and is visited by around 3,000 people on weekends and public holidays during the summer months.

History

In 1818,  were given to Thomas Bruin by Governor Macquarie. The estate became known as Freshwater, possibly because of a freshwater stream running between what are now Wyuna and Wyndora Avenues.

The place remained virtually uninhabited until land sales in the 1880s. A subdivision of the land became known as Harbord after Margaret Cecilia Harbord, wife of governor Lord Carrington.

From the 1900s, Freshwater was a popular working-men-only camp. Tents soon gave way to huts with names like "The Ritz" and "Shark Bait". Female visitors were only allowed on Sundays. After the First World War, working-class families came to the camps and built new dwellings and lodges.

The original camps were owned and operated by people such as a Mr Lewers who built, in 1908, what is Harbord's oldest building (now a restaurant). In 1909 it was the location of the local post office.

What is now called the Wormhole (the tunnel linking Manly and Freshwater beaches) was built and blasted out by the owners of some of the Freshwater camps. Wishing to link Manly and Freshwater, they created a cave and a walkway which is still used today, although the pathway requires some climbing, due to rock falls. Remnants of the old pathway still remain.

The Freshwater Beach campsite became a place of disrepute. With the growth of Sydney, the Shire Clerk of Warringah, Mr. Jamieson, wrote to the Post Master General's Department in 1923 about changing the name of the community. It is recorded that this was because of the doubtful and riotous characters who frequented the place at weekends in the summer. The buses going there at the time had a sign on the destination board saying "Camp City".  Local police supported the change, so Harbord became the official name of the suburb.  It was not until 1980 that the beach regained the name Freshwater Beach.

The community grew when the district was developed for housing. In the 1930s, the Warringah Council declared that only brick houses could be built there and many of these still exist today.

At the back of the beach is the "Pilu at Freshwater" restaurant, and 100 metres from there is the Harbord Beach Hotel and pub, known to the locals as the "Harbord Hilton".

World Surfing Reserve
On 10 March 2012, the four-kilometre (6 mi) stretch between Freshwater Beach and Shelly Beach was declared the "Manly - Freshwater World Surfing Reserve".  The Reserve was dedicated in a ceremony at Manly Beach by world surfing champion Kelly Slater accompanied by the Governor of New South Wales, Australia, Professor Marie Bashir.

See also
Freshwater, New South Wales
Duke Kahanamoku

References

Beaches of New South Wales